Rocchetta Belbo is a comune (municipality) in the Province of Cuneo in the Italian region Piedmont, located about  southeast of Turin and about 60 kilometres northeast of Cuneo.

References

Cities and towns in Piedmont